is a Prefectural Natural Park in southern Aomori Prefecture, Japan. Established in 1953, the park spans the borders of the municipalities of Hirakawa and Ōwani.

See also
 National Parks of Japan

References

Parks and gardens in Aomori Prefecture
Hirakawa, Aomori
Ōwani, Aomori
Protected areas established in 1953
1953 establishments in Japan